Charlie or Charles Davey may refer to:

 Charlie Davey (footballer) (1908–1991), Australian rules footballer
 Charlie Davey (cyclist) (1887–1964), British racing cyclist
 Charles Pierce Davey (1925–2002), American welterweight boxer and a boxing commissioner for the state of Michigan
 J. Charles Davey (1869–1939), American Catholic priest and Jesuit